Francis Manioru (born September 17, 1981) is a sprinter from the Solomon Islands who specializes in the 100 metres.

He participated at the 2004 Olympic Games where he achieved 11.05 seconds in the heats. Four years later, at the 2008 Summer Olympics he finished in eighth and last position in his heat with a time of 11.09 seconds.

Personal best

Achievements

References

External links
 

1981 births
Living people
Solomon Islands male sprinters
Athletes (track and field) at the 2004 Summer Olympics
Athletes (track and field) at the 2008 Summer Olympics
Olympic athletes of the Solomon Islands
Athletes (track and field) at the 2006 Commonwealth Games
Athletes (track and field) at the 2010 Commonwealth Games
Athletes (track and field) at the 2014 Commonwealth Games
Commonwealth Games competitors for the Solomon Islands
World Athletics Championships athletes for Solomon Islands